Denarie Taylor (born February 8, 1997), known professionally as Bella Poarch, is a Philippine-born American singer and social media personality. On August 17, 2020, she created the most liked video on TikTok, in which she lip syncs to the song "M to the B" by British rapper Millie B. She is the most followed TikTok contributor in the Philippines. In May 2021, she released her debut single "Build a Bitch".

 she has over 92.8 million followers on TikTok, ranking as the third most-followed individual on the platform behind Khaby Lame and Charli D'Amelio. She signed a music record deal with Warner Records in 2021.

Early life 
Bella Poarch was born on February 8, 1997, in the Philippines to Filipino parents. She was raised by her grandmother in the slums until the age of three and was then adopted. Her adoptive father is an American who had served in the US military and her adoptive mother is Filipina; both adoptive parents had met in Saudi Arabia where her adoptive father was stationed, before settling in the Philippines. In an interview, she recounts that she and her adopted brother were heavily abused all throughout her childhood, up until her enrollment in the military. She lived on a farm with her family: two older (adopted) sisters, her adoptive parents, and her brother. She had many of the responsibilities for the farm, even as young as seven years old. She recounts that her adoptive sisters did not receive the same treatment as her. Poarch says that her father was verbally and physically abusive, while her mother did not get involved. Her family (except her two older sisters who still reside in the Philippines) moved to San Francisco to live with her aunt for a couple of months, before the family moved to Texas when she was 13 due to her father's need for bypass surgery. She says that the abuse decreased, but she still faced some mental abuse from her father at home.

Musical career 

In January 2020, Poarch created her TikTok account. She started actively posting on TikTok based on gaming and cosplay content in April 2020. She gained notability in August 2020, when her lip sync videos went viral, most notably her video where she is lip-syncing to "Sophie Aspin Send" by Millie B. The zoomed-in video of her lip-syncing to that tune and rhythmically bouncing went viral and became TikTok's most liked video of all time. Following her TikTok success, she launched a YouTube channel and Twitter page in the months after she joined TikTok.
 
Poarch is also associated with her alpaca stuffed toy. In 2020, she released a limited clothing line RIPNDIP x Paca Collaboration.

In December 2020, Poarch's rising popularity peaked when she reportedly grabbed the interest of two large professional Esports organizations – 100 Thieves and FaZe Clan, which apparently showed interest in her, a live streamer and gamer at the time, as a content creator under their respective banners. In May 2021, Poarch signed a record deal with Warner Records.

On May 14, 2021, Poarch released her debut single "Build a Bitch". The associated music video, which appeared on YouTube, was described by Billboard as "an audacious, darkly comic slice of new-school pop", created with Daniel Virgil Maisonneuve, the producer-songwriter better known as Sub Urban." The video features other notable internet personalities including Valkyrae, Mia Khalifa, Bretman Rock and ZHC.

On an episode of the 100 Thieves podcast "The CouRage and Nadeshot Show", Poarch said that the song traces back to her own history of being bullied as a child. Poarch said on the podcast that she had wanted to become a singer since she was a child.

Poarch released her first EP, Dolls, on August 12, 2022. It includes her previous singles, "Build a Bitch", "Inferno", and "Dolls", as well as new tracks "Villain", "No Man's Land", and "Living Hell". A music video for "Living Hell" debuted alongside the EP. In addition to co-starring in the music video for "Dolls", Grimes features on "No Man's Land". Rolling Stone praised the dark pop tone of the EP. In addition, "Villain" would be used for WWE's Extreme Rules premium live event in 2022.

Military career 
Poarch is a U.S. Navy veteran. She enlisted in the Navy in 2017 as an aviation ordnanceman and served for three years, having been stationed in Japan and Hawaii.

Personal life 
Poarch resides in Los Angeles.

She has expressed her support on social media for the Asian-American community due to the rise in reports of hate crimes towards them. She also shared her experiences with Vogue, saying that she can relate to this situation because she has been "treated differently" and "randomly attacked and assaulted" as an Asian teen after moving to the U.S. from the Philippines.

In September 2020, Korean social media users criticized Poarch for having a tattoo similar to the Rising Sun Flag in her videos. The specific tattoo resembled a symbol of Japanese imperialism which is considered offensive to East Asians. She apologized and had it covered and later removed. Poarch married Tyler Poarch in 2019. She filed for divorce from him in November 2022.

Discography

Extended plays

Singles

Awards and nominations

Notes

References

External links 
 
 

1997 births
Living people
21st-century American women singers
21st-century American singers
American TikTokers
American YouTubers
Cosplayers
Filipino emigrants to the United States
United States Navy sailors
Warner Records artists